Elizabeth Amélia Basílio Viegas, (born 20 January 1985) is an Angolan handball player. She plays for Angolan side Primeiro de Agosto. Elizabeth also played for the Angolan national team.

References

External links
 

1985 births
Living people
Angolan female handball players
Olympic handball players of Angola
Handball players at the 2008 Summer Olympics
Handball players from Luanda
African Games gold medalists for Angola
African Games medalists in handball
Competitors at the 2015 African Games